Karson Kendall (born April 1, 2000) is a United States Virgin Islands international soccer player who currently plays for Kings Hammer FC of the USL League Two.

Club career
From 2015 to 2018 Kendall played for the youth academy teams of Sporting Kansas City of Major League Soccer. In 2019 he made two league appearances for North Carolina Fusion U23 of USL League Two. For the 2021 season Kendall returned to the USL League Two, signing for Kings Hammer FC.

Career statistics

References

External links
 National Football Teams profile
 Karson Kendall at the High Point University

2000 births
Living people
High Point Panthers men's soccer players
American soccer players
United States Virgin Islands soccer players
United States Virgin Islands international soccer players
Sporting Kansas City players
Association football defenders
Soccer players from Phoenix, Arizona